Notopala is a genus of moderately large to large, freshwater snails with an operculum, aquatic gastropod mollusks in the family Viviparidae, the river snails or mystery snails.

Description 
The shell is dextral and globose-conic. The shell has up to five whorls. The aperture is subovate. The operculum is corneous and concentric. Colour is usually yellow, olive green, brown, cream or white and sometimes may have darker spiral bands. Head-foot with long tentacles with eyes on short processes at their outer bases; often pigmented with multiple different colours.

Distribution 
The genus of Notopala is native to Australia. Notopala is found in all states and territories except Tasmania. It occurs throughout Queensland and New South Wales, northern Western Australia and Northern Territory and in the Murray-Darling Basin in Victoria and South Australia.

Habitat and ecology 
Generally occurs on fine sediment and/or on and under rocks and logs. Members of Notopala are thought to be grazers of periphyton and occur in slow moving or still waters. Some species are able to aestivate in mud during dry periods.

Species
Species within the genus Notopala include:
 † Notopala albascopularis (Etheridge, 1902) - synonym: Viviparus (?) albascopularis Etheridge, 1902 - from Aptian, Wallumbilla Formation, New South Wales
 Notopala ampullaroides  (Reeve, 1863)
 Notopala essingtonensis (Frauenfeld, 1862)
 Notopala hanleyi  (Frauenfeld, 1864)
 Notopala kingi (A. Adams & Angas, 1864)
 Notopala kingi kingi (A. Adams & Angas, 1864)
 Notopala kingi suprafasciata  (Tryon, 1866)
 Notopala sublineata Conrad, 1850
 Notopala sublineata sublineata Conrad, 1850
 Notopala sublineata alisoni (Brazier, 1979)
 † Notopala wanjacalda Cotton, 1935 - from upper Pleistocene near Sunnyside, South Australia
 Notopala waterhousii (Adams & Angus, 1864)
 Notopala tricincta  (E. A. Smith, 1882)
Note:

"Banded species of Notopala occur in several parts of northern Australia and Queensland that are similar to N. essingtonensis, N. tricincta and N. kingi but are thought to be different species (W. Ponder, unpublished studies). These should be identified simply as Notopala sp."

The type species of the genus Notopala is Paludina hanleyi Frauenfeld, 1862, by original designation

References

External links 
https://biodiversity.org.au/afd/taxa/Notopala
 http://keys.lucidcentral.org/keys/v3/freshwater_molluscs/Freshwater_Oct18/Media/Html/notopala.htm



Viviparidae
Gastropods of Australia
Taxonomy articles created by Polbot